is a Japanese professional footballer who plays as a defensive midfielder for J1 League club Urawa Red Diamonds.

Career
After attending Meiji University and even getting picked for All Japan University XI, Shibato joined Urawa Red Diamonds in May 2017.

Club statistics
Updated to 29 October 2022.

Honours
Urawa Red Diamonds
Emperor's Cup: 2018, 2021
AFC Champions League runner-up: 2019
Japanese Super Cup: 2022

References

External links

Profile at Urawa Red Diamonds
Profile at J. League

1995 births
Living people
Association football people from Kanagawa Prefecture
Japanese footballers
J1 League players
Urawa Red Diamonds players
Association football midfielders
Universiade gold medalists for Japan
Universiade medalists in football